Sergey Nikolayevich Zhunenko (born 13 May 1970) is a former Kazakhstani professional footballer.

Club career
He made his professional debut in the Soviet First League in 1989 for FC Kairat.

Honours
 Russian Premier League runner-up: 1997.
 Russian Premier League bronze: 1996.
 Russian Cup finalist: 1995.
 Ukrainian Premier League runner-up: 1998, 1999.

European club competitions
With FC Rotor Volgograd.

 1994–95 UEFA Cup: 2 games.
 1995–96 UEFA Cup: 3 games.
 1996 UEFA Intertoto Cup: 6 games.
 1997–98 UEFA Cup: 3 games.

References

1970 births
People from Novosibirsk Oblast
Living people
Kazakhstani people of Ukrainian descent
Soviet footballers
Kazakhstani footballers
Kazakhstan international footballers
Kazakhstani expatriate footballers
Russian Premier League players
Ukrainian Premier League players
FC Kairat players
FC Zorya Luhansk players
FC Rotor Volgograd players
FC Shakhtar Donetsk players
FC Metalurh Donetsk players
FC KAMAZ Naberezhnye Chelny players
FC Tekstilshchik Kamyshin players
Expatriate footballers in Ukraine
Kazakhstani expatriate sportspeople in Ukraine
FC Mordovia Saransk players
Expatriate footballers in Russia
Association football defenders
Association football midfielders
FC Metallurg Lipetsk players
FC Taraz players